Epsom was a borough constituency represented in the House of Commons of the Parliament of the United Kingdom. It elected one Member of Parliament (MP) by the first past the post system of election. From its creation in 1885 until its abolition in 1974, it was won by eight Conservatives. The winner took less than 50% of the votes in its contested elections once, in 1945, receiving 49.9% of the vote in a three-party contest.  Six elections, the last being a by-election in 1912, were uncontested.

History

Geographical history
Creation and abolition
The seat was established under the Redistribution of Seats Act 1885 as the Mid or Epsom division of Surrey for the 1885 general election. The Mid designation was lesser used, since it could be misleading, as its extent until 1885 was a long strip to the east bounded by among other parishes: Lambeth, Streatham, Croydon, Burstow, Capel and Sutton.

Scope
The Act of 1885 set up the seat so as to comprise:
Epsom sessional division
all parts of Kingston (& Elmbridge) sessional division not within Kingston parish, nor municipal borough; which meant outlying parishes to the south-west, south and south-east
Effingham (parish)
Mickleham (parish)

Thus the seat drew on Mid Surrey as to Tolworth, New Malden, Malden, Worcester Park, Surbiton, Hook, Coombe and Long Ditton in the Kingston Hundred and Sessional Division. It drew on West Surrey as to: Ashtead; Banstead; Great Bookham; Little Bookham; Cheam; Chessington; Cuddington; Epsom; Ewell; Fetcham; Headley; Leatherhead; Sutton; Walton on the Hill; Cobham; Thames Ditton; Esher; East Molesey; West Molesey; Stoke D'Abernon; and Walton on Thames.

The Representation of the People Act 1918 cut the area down to its south-eastern third namely:
the borough of Epsom and Ewell
Leatherhead Urban District 
Sutton Urban District

The Representation of the People Act 1948 confirmed a 1945-implemented split-up of all seats of more than 100,000 electors, of Sutton and Cheam Urban District to create Sutton and Cheam (UK Parliament constituency) to the north-east. Removal of a broad western area to form Esher ensued in 1950. As such it remained in the 1970 review-implementing Order. The 1983 reforms saw more than its renaming and technical abolition, the seat shed in the south the former Leatherhead Urban District to Mole Valley created that year.

The seat was abolished for the February 1974 general election, replaced by Epsom and Ewell except for its south which contributed to the new seat of Mole Valley.

Boundaries
1885–1918: The Sessional Divisions of Epsom and Kingston (comprising most of Elmbridge) as excluding "the part of the civil parish of Kingston [and] the Municipal Borough of Kingston-on-Thames", and the (mainly rural) civil parishes of Effingham and Mickleham to the south-west and south respectively.

1918–1945: The Urban Districts of Epsom, Leatherhead, and Sutton, and the Rural District of Epsom.

1945–1974: The Municipal Borough of Epsom and Ewell, and the Urban District of Leatherhead.

Members of Parliament

Elections

Elections in the 1880s

Elections in the 1890s

Elections in the 1900s

Elections in the 1910s 

General election 1914–15:

Another general election was required to take place before the end of 1915. The political parties had been making preparations for an election to take place and by July 1914, the following candidates had been selected; 
Unionist: Henry Keswick

Elections in the 1920s

Elections in the 1930s 

General election 1939–40:

Another general election was required to take place before the end of 1940. The political parties had been making preparations for an election to take place and by the Autumn of 1939, the following candidates had been selected; 
Conservative: Archibald Southby
Labour: C Hackforth-Jones
Liberal: John Pickering Hughes

Elections in the 1940s

Elections in the 1950s

Elections in the 1960s

Elections in the 1970s

See also
 List of parliamentary constituencies in Surrey

References

Parliamentary constituencies in South East England (historic)
Epsom and Ewell
Constituencies of the Parliament of the United Kingdom established in 1885
Constituencies of the Parliament of the United Kingdom disestablished in 1974
Politics of Surrey
Mole Valley